Captain Kate, is a US newspaper comic strip created by Jerry and Hale Skelly. Captain Kate was Kate Stevens, a female captain/owner of a trading ship, the Wind Song, in the late 18th century. The comic, written by Jerry's wife Hale Skelly, was distributed by King Features from May 28, 1967, to May 21, 1972.

References

1967 comics debuts
1972 comics endings
American comics characters
American comic strips
Comics about women
Comics set in the 18th century
Female characters in comics
Fictional sea captains
Nautical comics
Pirate comics